Youth Power is a 2015 Taiwanese political drama, comedy, romance television series created and produced by TVBS. Starring Tammy Chen, Yao Yuan Hao, Jason Tsou, and Nana Lee as the main cast. Filming began on January 8, 2015 and wrapped up on July 21, 2015. First original broadcast began on May 1, 2015 on TTV airing every Friday night at 10:10-11:40 pm.

Synopsis
Can three young people choose their own futures even when life throws them in an unexpected direction? Chen Yi Jun (Tammy Chen) grows up in a political family but detests politics and is determined to pursue her passion for music. But after college graduation, she is forced to return home and is thrown into the midst of her family drama. She teams up with her childhood friend Jiang Ye Qing (Yao Yuan Hao), who also grew up in a political family and thrives in it, and the social activist Huang Zhao Yuan (Jason Tsou). Forced to grow up among the pressures of the real world, can Yi Jun, Zhao Yuan and Ye Qing make the world bend to their own desires in life?

Cast

Main cast
 as Chen Yi Jun 陳怡君 
Yao Yuan-hao as Jiang Ye Qing 江也晴
 as Huang Zhao Yuan 黃兆元
Nana Lee 李千娜 as Sha Bing Na 沙冰娜

Supporting cast
Lu Yi-ching as Lin Li Zi 林麗子
Tsai Chen-nan as Chen Jing Sheng 陳敬昇
 as Lian Bai He 連百合
 as Pai Pai 拍拍
 as Ban Jie Ming 班傑明（Benjamin）
 as Jiang Bian 江邊

Special guest actors
 as Xia Zhi Jie 夏志傑
 as Du Shen 杜聲
  as Zhao Yuan's mother
 as Chen Qi Long 陳其龍
Akio Chen as Wan Tong 萬通
 as Lin Xian Cai (Xian Zi) 林仙財（仙仔）
 as Liu Guang Ming 劉光明
Wang Zi Qiang 王自強 as Ah Yong Bo 阿勇伯
 as Ah Zhu 阿珠
Cindy Yen 袁詠琳 as Su Fei 蘇菲（Sophie）
Ke Ci Hui 柯慈輝 as Brother Mao
Qu Xian Ping 曲獻平 as Leslie
Wang Hong Dao 王鴻道 as Li Gan Shi 李幹事
Chen Hui Wen 陳繪文 as Ah Hui 阿惠
 as Lou Ri Xin 樓日新
Xu Zhi Wei 許志偉 as policemen
Jiang Rui Zhi 姜瑞智 as demonstrator

Special performances
You Xiao Bai 游小白 as store manager
 as Amy
 as Li Tian Bao 李天寶
Hu Jun 胡鈞 as mayor
 as Yang Xian Jin 楊先進
 as Zheng Zi Xiang 鄭子翔
 as school principal

Soundtrack
Light and Heat 含廣告 by Wu Bai 伍佰
Rose's Diary 玫瑰日記 by Wu Bai 伍佰 feat. Nana Lee 李千娜
It's All Good 一切安好 by Karen Mok 莫文蔚
Even If 哪怕 by Karen Mok 莫文蔚
Regardez 看看 by Karen Mok 莫文蔚
Fight For Dream 強心臟 by Boxing Yue Tuan Boxing樂團
Think of Home 思故鄉 by Boxing Yue Tuan Boxing樂團

Broadcast

Episode ratings
<small>Competing dramas on rival channels airing at the same time slot were:
SET Taiwan - Life of Pearl, An Adopted Daughter
FTV - Justice Heroes
SETTV - Murphy's Law of Love, Love Cuisine
CTV - Crime Scene Investigation Center, Doctor Stranger

Awards and nominations

References

External links
Youth Power TTV Website  
Youth Power TVBS Website  

2015 Taiwanese television series debuts
2015 Taiwanese television series endings
TVBS original programming
Taiwan Television original programming
Television shows written by Luo Ying Wu